Arthur Hind may refer to:
 Arthur Hind (industrialist) (1856–1933), American industrialist and philatelist
 Arthur Charles Hind (1904–?), Indian field hockey player who competed in the 1932 Summer Olympics
 Arthur Mayger Hind (1880–1957), curator at the British Museum and art historian of old master prints